Oleksiy Serhiyovych Khoblenko (born 4 April 1994) is a Ukrainian professional footballer who plays as a striker for Karpaty Lviv on loan from Kryvbas Kryvyi Rih.

Career
Khoblenko is a product of the Elektron Romny, Yunist Chernihiv in Chernihiv and Dynamo youth sportive schools. He started his senior career in the Ukrainian First League club Dynamo-2 Kyiv.

Poltava (Loan)
In Summer 2013 he moved on loan for FC Poltava in Ukrainian First League, where in the season 2013-14, he played 18 games and scored 4 goals.

Dynamo-2 Kyiv
In summer 2014 he moved to Dynamo-2 Kyiv in Ukrainian First League, where in the season 2014-15, he played 28 games and he scored 7 goals.

Hoverla Uzhhorod (loan)
In 2015 he went on loan to Hoverla Uzhhorod.

Chornomorets Odesa
In 2016 he moved to Chornomorets Odesa then he extended his contract. Here he played until 2018.

Lech Poznań (Loan)
On 12 January 2018 he was loaned for a half year to Ekstraklasa side Lech Poznań, where he contributed to Europa League first qualifying round, playing 11 matches and scoring 2 goals.

Dynamo Brest
In summer 2018 he moved to Dynamo Brest , where he won the Belarusian Premier League in 2019
the Belarusian Cup in 2017–18 and two Belarusian Super Cup in 2018 and 2019

Dnipro-1
In 2020, he moved to Dnipro-1 and on 12 September 2020 he scored against Olimpik Donetsk in Ukrainian Premier League. On 18 september 2020 he scored against FC Mariupol at Dnipro Arena and on 22 November 2020 he scored against FC Mynai On 1 May 2021 he scored against Shakhtar Donetsk in Ukrainian Premier League in the season 2020-21 at the Olympic Stadium in Kyiv

Stabæk (Loan)
On 11 May 2021 he went on loan to Stabæk in Eliteserien.

Dnipro-1
In summer 2021, he returned to Dnipro-1 in Ukrainian Premier League. Rumors state that, earlier in the press wrote that Khoblenko on lease rights will pass to Kryvbas Kryvyi Rih for which already played the first control match against Oleksandriya scoring also by penalty.

Kryvbas Kryvyi Rih
On 21 July 2021 he went on loan to Kryvbas Kryvyi Rih (2020) in the Ukrainian First League. On 25 July he made his debut, scoring a goal against Olimpik Donetsk. On 7 August he scored against Hirnyk-Sport Horishni Plavni. On 14 August he scored two goals against Kremin Kremenchuk. He has been voted Player of the Month for August 2021. On 12 September he scored four goals in a match against Uzhhorod. As a result, he was voted Player of Week for round 8 of the Ukrainian First League. On 5 November he scored against Nyva Ternopil. On 21 November he scored two goals against Kremin Kremenchuk. On 11 December, he signed a permanent two-and-a-half-year contract with the club.

FCI Levadia (Loan)
On 10 March 2022, Khoblenko joined Estonian club FCI Levadia on loan as a result of the 2022 Russian invasion of Ukraine. On 20 April he scored his first goal with the new club against Narva.

Karpaty Lviv (Loan)
On 27 December 2022 he moved on loan Karpaty Lviv until the end of the season.

Career statistics

Club

Honours
Dynamo Brest
 Belarusian Premier League: 2019
 Belarusian Cup: 2017–18
 Belarusian Super Cup (2) 2018, 2019

FCI Levadia
Meistriliiga: Runner-Up 2022

Individual
 Top Scorer of Ukrainian First League: Runner Up season 2021–22 (11 goals)
 Best Player of Round 8 of Ukrainian First League: season 2021-22
 Best Player of August 2021 of Ukrainian First League: season 2021-22

References

External links
 Oleksiy Khoblenko at FCI Levadia 
 Oleksiy Khoblenko at FC Kryvbas 
 
 
 
 
 

Ukrainian footballers
Ukrainian expatriate footballers
FC Poltava players
Association football forwards
1994 births
Living people
Sportspeople from Yekaterinburg
Russian people of Ukrainian descent
Russian emigrants to Ukraine
FC Yunist Chernihiv players
FC Dynamo Kyiv players
FC Dynamo-2 Kyiv players
FC Hoverla Uzhhorod players
FC Chornomorets Odesa players
Lech Poznań players
FC Dynamo Brest players
SC Dnipro-1 players
Stabæk Fotball players
FC Kryvbas Kryvyi Rih players
FCI Levadia Tallinn players
FC Karpaty Lviv players
Ukrainian Premier League players
Ukrainian First League players
Ekstraklasa players
Eliteserien players
Expatriate footballers in Poland
Ukrainian expatriate sportspeople in Poland
Expatriate footballers in Norway
Ukrainian expatriate sportspeople in Norway
Expatriate footballers in Belarus
Ukrainian expatriate sportspeople in Belarus
Expatriate footballers in Estonia
Ukrainian expatriate sportspeople in Estonia
Ukraine youth international footballers
Ukraine under-21 international footballers
Meistriliiga players